Capricho (English title: Caprice) is a Mexican telenovela produced by Carlos Sotomayor for Televisa in 1993.

Victoria Ruffo and Humberto Zurita starred as protagonists, while Diana Bracho and Patricia Pereyra starred as main antagonists. Juan Peláez, Armando Silvestre and the leading actress María Teresa Rivas starred as stellar performances.

Plot 
Eugenia Montaño is a powerful and strong character that owns "Viñedos del Sol", a renowned vineyard that has been in her family for decades woman. She is married to Antonio Aranda, a writer of gentle and submissive and deeply in love with his wife character, with whom he has two daughters, the oldest is called Rachel and youngest's Cristina.

However, while Eugenia adores her older daughter despises the youngest one. This is because Rachel is not really the daughter of Antonio but Leon, the brother of this and the only man she has ever loved, but with which she could never marry. Therefore, she has lived most of her life with a man who  she does not love and a daughter who renounces not be the fruit of hers true love.

Raquel, as evil as her mother is just as cruel to Cristina, is Jorge girlfriend. This an honest young man who sincerely loves Rachel, but she has never liked him really, unlike Cristina, who loves him secretly.

Cast 
Victoria Ruffo as Cristina Aranda Montaño
Humberto Zurita as Daniel Franco
Diana Bracho as Eugenia Montaño de Aranda
Patricia Pereyra as Raquel Aranda Montaño
Juan Peláez as Antonio Aranda
Armando Silvestre as León Aranda
María Teresa Rivas as Doña Isabel Vda. de Montaño
Luis Aguilar as Don Jesús Tamayo
Silvia Mariscal as Mercedes de Aranda
Jorge Antolín as Jorge Nieto
Romina Castro as Teresa "Tita" Nieto
Bruno Rey as Braulio Nieto
Marina Marín as Flora de Nieto
Pilar Escalante as Sandra Ruiz
Constantino Costas as Rubén
Alejandro Ruiz as Fernando
Graciela Bernardos as Licha Gutiérrez
Cuca Dublán as Lupita
Lucía Muñoz as Mónica
Alejandro Tommasi as Tomás Ruiz
Israel Jaitovich as Nicolás
Margarita Ambriz as Esperanza
Georgina Pedret as Nora

Awards

References

External links

1993 telenovelas
Mexican telenovelas
1993 Mexican television series debuts
1993 Mexican television series endings
Spanish-language telenovelas
Television shows set in Mexico
Televisa telenovelas